Hoplostethus vniro is a small deep-sea fish species belonging to the slimehead family (Trachichthyidae). It is found in the eastern Central Atlantic in marine environment within a bathydemersal depth range, which is a deep-water habitat.

References

External links
 

vniro
Fish described in 1995
Fish of the Atlantic Ocean